The 2017–18 season was Al-Hazem's 7th consecutive season in the second tier of Saudi football and 61st year in existence. Along with competing in the Prince Mohammad bin Salman League, the club also participated in the King Cup.

The season covered the period from 1 July 2017 to 30 June 2018.

Players

Squad information

Transfers

In

Loans in

Out

Pre-season friendlies

Competitions

Overall

Last Updated: 18 April 2018

Prince Mohammad bin Salman League

League table

Results summary

Results by round

Matches
All times are local, AST (UTC+3).

King Cup

All times are local, AST (UTC+3).

Statistics

Squad statistics
As of 18 April 2018.

|-
!colspan="14"|Players who left during the season

|}

Goalscorers

Last Updated: 18 April 2018

Clean sheets

Last Updated: 7 March 2018

References

Al-Hazem F.C. seasons
Hazem